Porter Memorial Library may refer to:

 Porter Memorial Library (Maine) in Machias, Maine
 Porter Memorial Library (Massachusetts) in Blandford, Massachusetts